Jeyawati (meaning "grinding mouth" in the Zuni language) is a genus of hadrosauroid dinosaur which lived during the Turonian stage of the Late Cretaceous. The type species, J. rugoculus, was described in 2010, based on fossils recovered in the U.S. state of New Mexico.

The holotype, MSM P4166, was discovered in the Moreno Hill Formation. A cladistic analysis indicates that Jeyawati was more plesiomorphic (ancestral) than Shuangmiaosaurus, Telmatosaurus, and Bactrosaurus, but more derived (less like the common ancestor) than Eolambia, Probactrosaurus, and Protohadros.

References

Iguanodonts
Late Cretaceous dinosaurs of North America
Hadrosaurs
Fossil taxa described in 2010
Taxa named by James I. Kirkland
Paleontology in New Mexico
Ornithischian genera